Angel Kreiman Brill (1945–6 January 2014) was the Chief Rabbi of Chile, Director of the International Council of Christians and Jews in Latin America and the International Vice President of the World Council of Synagogues.<ref>{{cite web|url=http://www.iccj.org/Rabbi+Angel+Kreiman-Brill+z%27%27l+%281945-2014%29.4483.0.html?L=3|title=Rabbi Angel Kreiman-Brill zl (1945-2014)|date=9 January 2014|publisher=International Council of Christians and Jews|accessdate=28 June 2015}}</ref>

Early life and education
He was born in Buenos Aires into a secular Jewish family. He graduated as a Professor of Hebrew and Jewish Sciences in the Seminar Morim of Buenos Aires (1963) and as a Rabbi in the Latin American Rabbinical Seminar (1968). He married Susy Wolinsky in 1969. In 1975 he obtained a Degree in Right at the Free University of Colombia in Barranquilla, Colombia. He moved to Santiago in the 1970s.

Move to Argentina
In 1990 after a series of scandals, Kreiman left Chile and moved to Buenos Aires with his family. His wife was killed in the 1994 AMIA bombing.

Later life
In 1995, Kreiman returned to Chile to the southern city of Concepción, and in 2011 moved to Jerusalem. He died in 2014 in Chile.

Interfaith activities with Opus Dei
According to Kreiman Brill, Josemaría Escrivá's teachings are strongly rooted in Talmudic traditions about work. The Talmudic concept of work, said Kreiman, is that "work is not a punishment, but man's duty, a blessing from God that allows us to fully enjoy the Sabbath and allows us to be in the image and likeness of God".

WorksTesoros de La Tradicion Judia'' (May 1997)

References

1945 births
2014 deaths
Argentine Jews
Chief rabbis
Chilean Jews
Free University of Colombia alumni
People from Buenos Aires